Judas Ghost is a 2013 horror film directed by Simon Pearce and written by Simon R. Green based on his Ghost Finders novels.

Plot
A team of professional ghost finders are trapped in an old village hall. The haunting they set out to investigate turns out to be far worse than they anticipated. Who will survive and what will be left of their souls?

Cast
Martin Delaney as Jerry Mackay
Lucy Cudden as Anna Gilmour
Simon Merrells as Mark Vega
Alexander Perkins as Ian Calder
Grahame Fox as Judas Ghost

References

External links
 

2013 horror films
2013 films